Gray Peak is the unofficial name for the highest mountain of the Big Salmon Range in south-central Yukon, Canada, located  north of Johnson's Crossing and  south of Fox Mountain.

References

Two-thousanders of Yukon